Kang Young-mi (born 1 March 1985) is a South Korean left-handed épée fencer, four-time team Asian champion, 2017 individual Asian champion, and two-time Olympian.

Medal record

Olympic Games

Asian Championship

Grand Prix

World Cup

References

External links
 

1985 births
Living people
Sportspeople from Incheon
South Korean female fencers
South Korean épée fencers
Fencers at the 2016 Summer Olympics
Fencers at the 2020 Summer Olympics
Olympic fencers of South Korea
Fencers at the 2018 Asian Games
Asian Games gold medalists for South Korea
Asian Games silver medalists for South Korea
Asian Games medalists in fencing
Medalists at the 2018 Asian Games
Olympic medalists in fencing
Medalists at the 2020 Summer Olympics
Olympic silver medalists for South Korea
20th-century South Korean women
21st-century South Korean women
World Fencing Championships medalists